Corvara can refer to:

Places
Italy
Corvara, Abruzzo, a comune in the Province of Pescara
Corvara, South Tyrol, a comune in South Tyrol